Mimi Sheraton (born Miriam Solomon; February 10, 1926) is an American food critic and writer.

Family and education
Sheraton's mother, Beatrice, was described as an excellent cook and her father, Joseph Solomon, as a commission merchant in a wholesale produce market.

A 1943 graduate of Midwood High School, Sheraton attended the NYU School of Commerce, majoring in marketing and minoring in journalism. She went to work as a home furnishing copywriter and a certified interior designer.

Sheraton married Richard Falcone and had one son.

Food criticism
While traveling often as the home furnishing editor of Seventeen magazine, Sheraton began to explore her interest in food. In December 1975, she became the food critic for the New York Times.  She was its first female restaurant critic.After leaving the paper in 1983, she wrote for magazines such as Time, Condé Nast Traveler, Harper's Bazaar and Vogue. She lectured at the Cornell University School of Hotel Administration and the Culinary Institute of America in St. Helena, California. As of 2016, she is a food columnist for The Daily Beast.

Bibliography

Books
The Seducer's Cookbook, 1964
City Portraits; a Guide to 60 of the World's Great Cities, 1964
The German Cookbook, 1965
Family Circle's Barbecues From Around the World, 1973
Visions of Sugarplums: A Cookbook of Cakes, Cookies, Candies & Confections from All the Countries that Celebrate Christmas, 1986
The Whole World Loves Chicken Soup, 1995
Eating My Words: An Appetite for Life
1,000 Foods to Eat Before you Die
From My Mother's Kitchen, 1977
Mimi Sheraton's Favorite New York Restaurants , 1991
Food Tales, 1992
Food Markets of the World, 1997
Hors d'Oeuvres & Appetizers, 2001
The Bialy Eaters, 2000
Eating My Words, 2004

Articles

Awards
1974 Penney-Missouri Award
1996 IACP and James Beard Foundation Awards, for The Whole World Loves Chicken Soup
2014 James Beard Award for Magazine Feature Writing About Restaurants and/or Chefs, for an article on the Four Seasons’ 40th anniversary in Vanity Fair

References

External links
 One on 1: Food Critic Mimi Sheraton

New York University Stern School of Business alumni
American food writers
People from Flatbush, Brooklyn
American restaurant critics
Critics employed by The New York Times
The New Yorker people
Living people
Midwood High School alumni
1926 births
James Beard Foundation Award winners